George Bennett (2 August 1832 — 11 March 1913) was an English first-class cricketer.

The son of Henry Bennett, he was born in August 1832 in Italy at Naples. He was educated at Winchester College, before going up to St John's College, Oxford. While studying at Oxford, Bennett played two first-class cricket matches for Oxford University separated by four years. His first match came against the Marylebone Cricket Club at Oxford in 1852, with his second appearance coming against Cambridge University at Lord's in 1856. He failed to score any runs in his two appearances and was dismissed without scoring in all three of his batting innings'. After graduating from Oxford he joined the Civil Service, where he worked as a senior clerk at the Office of Woods and Forests. Bennett died in March 1913 at Southbourne, Hampshire.

References

External links

1832 births
1913 deaths
19th-century Neapolitan people
People educated at Winchester College
Alumni of New College, Oxford
English cricketers
Oxford University cricketers
English civil servants